The 1929 Brooklyn Robins finished the season in 6th place for the fifth straight season.

Offseason 
 December 11, 1929: Jesse Petty and Harry Riconda were traded by the Robins to the Pittsburgh Pirates for Glenn Wright.

Regular season

Season standings

Record vs. opponents

Notable transactions 
 April 18, 1929: Johnny Gooch and Rube Ehrhardt were traded by the Robins to the Cincinnati Reds for Val Picinich.
 July 24, 1929: Lou Koupal was traded by the Robins to the Philadelphia Phillies for Luther Roy.

Roster

Player stats

Batting

Starters by position 
Note: Pos = Position; G = Games played; AB = At bats; H = Hits; Avg. = Batting average; HR = Home runs; RBI = Runs batted in

Other batters 
Note: G = Games played; AB = At bats; H = Hits; Avg. = Batting average; HR = Home runs; RBI = Runs batted in

Pitching

Starting pitchers 
Note: G = Games pitched; IP = Innings pitched; W = Wins; L = Losses; ERA = Earned run average; SO = Strikeouts

Other pitchers 
Note: G = Games pitched; IP = Innings pitched; W = Wins; L = Losses; ERA = Earned run average; SO = Strikeouts

Relief pitchers 
Note: G = Games pitched; W = Wins; L = Losses; SV = Saves; ERA = Earned run average; SO = Strikeouts

Notes

References 
Baseball-Reference season page
Baseball Almanac season page

External links 
1929 Brooklyn Robins uniform
Brooklyn Dodgers reference site
Acme Dodgers page 
Retrosheet

Los Angeles Dodgers seasons
Brooklyn Robins season
Brooklyn
1920s in Brooklyn
Flatbush, Brooklyn